The 73rd Army Division(2nd Formation) was organized in October 1969 at Chengxihu Farm in Huoqiu, Anhui province. In December 1969 the division was officially designated as 73rd Army Division.

The division was a part of 60th Army Corps. As its activation the division was composed of following regiments:
217th Infantry Regiment;
218th Infantry Regiment;
219th Infantry Regiment;
Artillery Regiment.

The division conducts agricultural construction missions until December 1978, when the division was disbanded and absorbed by Chengxihu Farm.

References

中国人民解放军各步兵师沿革，http://blog.sina.com.cn/s/blog_a3f74a990101cp1q.html

Infantry divisions of the People's Liberation Army
Military units and formations established in 1969
Military units and formations disestablished in 1978